Wenxin Zhongqing is a metro station on the Green Line operated by Taichung Metro in North District, Taichung, Taiwan.

The station name is taken from its location at the intersection of Wenxin and Zhongqing Roads. Taichung Metro is planning for a transfer to the Orange Line at this stop.

Station layout

References 

Taichung Metro
Railway stations in Taichung
Railway stations opened in 2020